The Bear's Reach is a technical rock climbing route on Lover's Leap near Lake Tahoe, California.  Considered a classic for its grade, it includes both face and crack climbing.  The route is named for the crux of the second pitch, a long reach between two large holds.   The route is best known in popular culture through viral video featuring Dan Osman speed climbing the route in 4 min 25 sec, and completing a famous ropeless double dyno between two holds.  The video was featured in Masters of Stone IV, 1997.

This mark was bettered when Alex Honnold completed it in 4:15.

References

External links 
summitpost.org
rockclimbing.com
mountainproject.com
supertopo

Climbing routes
Viral videos